Santa Cruz is a census-designated place (CDP) in Starr County, Texas, United States. It is a new CDP for 2010 census with a population of 54. There is a former CDP of the same name that was split into the El Chaparral and Santa Rosa CDPs.

Geography
Santa Cruz is located at  (26.353689, -98.767615).

References

Census-designated places in Starr County, Texas
Census-designated places in Texas